Coenodomus hampsoni is a species of snout moth in the genus Coenodomus. It was described by West in 1931, and is known from the Philippines.

References

Moths described in 1931
Epipaschiinae